Colegio Sagrados Corazones (Sacred Hearts School) is a Catholic day school in the town of Miranda de Ebro in northern Spain. It stands on the southern side of the river Ebro. The three-storey classroom building forms an L-shape around the patio

Curriculum
The school's subjects include; Spanish, mathematics, biology/geology, chemistry/physics, religion, English, French, Latin, economics, history, ethics, music, IT, and physical education.

Schools in Spain